Izudin Bajrović (born 9 February 1963) is a Bosnian theater, film and television actor. He has appeared in more than forty films since 1986.

Recent activity
In 2017, Bajrović signed the Declaration on the Common Language of the Croats, Serbs, Bosniaks and Montenegrins.

Selected filmography

References

External links

1963 births
Living people
People from Pljevlja
Bosniaks of Montenegro
Bosnia and Herzegovina male film actors
Signatories of the Declaration on the Common Language